Jermaine Lateef Rivers (born September 22, 1973) is an American actor. He is best known for his role as Shatter on Fox/Marvel's television series The Gifted. He is also notable for his role as Officer Carter in the Lifetime Channel television series Devious Maids. He also made appearances in Tyler Perry's If Loving You is Wrong (2016) and The Haves and Have Nots (2018).

Early life and career 

Rivers was born in Vicenza, Italy on Caserma Ederle to Brenda J Rivers and Jerry B Rivers (deceased) who was an active duty US Army service member stationed in Italy until 1975. He graduated from Fort campbell high school in 1992. In 1993 he enlisted in the US Army and attended Basic Training at Fort Jackson, SC. Rivers served on active duty from 17 March 1993 to 31 May 2013. He had a total of five deployments, two of which were combat tours to Iraq Baghdad while assigned with the 22nd Signal Brigade (2002-2003) also Bagram and Khandahar Afghanistan while under the 16th Sustainment Brigade command (2009-2010). Rivers' first role in a feature film was in Killing Winston Jones starring Danny Glover and Richard Dreyfuss.

Career 
Some of Rivers' earlier film credits include The Sacrament(2013) and Magic Mike XXL (2015). In 2016, Rivers was cast as Frank Colton in episode 1x16 of MacGyver. Rivers reprised the role of Frank Colton originally played by Cleavon Little, a member of The Coltons family of bounty hunters who made frequent appearances in the original MacGyver television series. Rivers' more recent film credits include the suspense thriller Hangman (2017) starring  Al Pacino and Karl Urban, also  Den of Thieves (2018) starring Gerard Butler and Curtis (50 Cent) Jackson. Over the years Jermaine Rivers has proven himself to be a diverse actor that can be cast in a multitude of character roles. His performances as Shatter on The Gifted (2017) showcased his physical abilities as he performed all of his own stunts. His ability to deliver tongue in cheek comedy was made apparently clear in his portrayal of (Rod) in the horror-comedy The Night Sitter (2018). Rivers was recently cast in the role of (Dee) in the Civil War era film Freedom's Path (2020) starring Ewen Bremner, RJ Cyler and Gerran Howell.

Filmography

References

External links 
 

1973 births
Living people
African-American male actors
American male television actors
People from Vicenza
United States Army soldiers
21st-century American actors
21st-century African-American people
20th-century African-American people